Zigra may refer to:

Zığra, a village in the Kütahya Province of Turkey
Gamera vs. Zigra, a 1971 Japanese film.